Devosiaceae is a family of Alphaproteobacteria.

Phylogeny
The currently accepted taxonomy is based on the List of Prokaryotic names with Standing in Nomenclature (LPSN). The phylogeny is based on whole-genome analysis.

References

Hyphomicrobiales
Bacteria families